Seyyed Shahab Rural District is a rural district (dehestan) in the Central District of Tuyserkan County, Hamadan Province, Iran. At the 2006 census, its population was 8,223, in 1,933 families. The rural district has 9 villages.

References 

Rural Districts of Hamadan Province
Tuyserkan County